Pittenweem in Fife was a royal burgh that returned one commissioner to the Parliament of Scotland and to the Convention of Estates.

After the Acts of Union 1707, Pittenweem, Anstruther Easter, Anstruther Wester, Crail and Kilrenny formed the Anstruther Easter district of burghs, returning one member between them to the House of Commons of Great Britain.

List of burgh commissioners

 1662-63: Thomas Swinton 
 1665 convention, 1681–82: George Russel, councillor 
 1669–74: Harry Wilkie 
 1678 (convention): John Myrton, bailie 
 1685–86: James Cook, bailie
 1689 (convention), 1689–1701: George Smyth of Giblistoun 
 1702–07: George Smyth the younger of Giblistoun

See also
 List of constituencies in the Parliament of Scotland at the time of the Union

References

Constituencies of the Parliament of Scotland (to 1707)
Politics of Fife
History of Fife
Constituencies disestablished in 1707
1707 disestablishments in Scotland
Pittenweem